Harmon Ray Seawel (born May 5, 1943) is an American politician who served as a member of the Arkansas House of Representatives from 1999 to 2005. A Democrat, he was the House's majority leader from 2001 to 2005.

References

External links

1943 births
Living people
Arkansas State University alumni
Harding University alumni
Democratic Party members of the Arkansas House of Representatives
People from Pocahontas, Arkansas
University of Mississippi alumni
20th-century American politicians
21st-century American politicians